The Mortier de 150 mm T Modèle 1917 Fabry was the standard French heavy trench mortar of World War I. It remained in service through 1940, with some 1,159 available during the Phony War. The tube was supported by two recoil-recuperators in a flask-rocker assembly that was mounted on a platform with six fixed spades. The finned mortar "bomb" was loaded from the muzzle, but the propellant was loaded from the breech and ignited by a percussion ignition system.

For transport it was broken down into three loads, each towed on machine gun carts by either one horse or eight men. Each cart also carried twenty  bombs.

References

External links
French mortars of World War I
post by David Lehman on Feldgrau.net Forum
List and pictures of World War I surviving 150mm T Mle 1917 Fabry Mortars

World War I mortars of France
150 mm artillery